Andrea Bonomi (14 February 1923 – 26 November 2003)  was an Italian footballer who played as a defender.

Early life
Born in Cassano d'Adda, Italy, when Bonomi was six years old, he fell in Adda River and was about to drown when a 10-year-old boy rescued him. Ironically, his rescuer was Valentino Mazzola, who went on to become one of the greatest Italian football players of all time, captaining the Grande Torino team of the 1940s, which would be killed in the Superga air disaster.

Club career
Bonomi was initially nicknamed Ciapin during his early career. He played for several Italian football clubs, but spent most of his career with A.C. Milan. He served as Milan's captain during the 1950–51 season, which ended with a Serie A triumph for the rossoneri, led by the Gre-No-Li attacking trio.

International career
Bonomi played for the Italy national football team for just one match, in 1951, against Switzerland.

Style of play
A tenacious and dynamic defender, Bonomi usually played as a full-back.

Honours

Club
Milan
Serie A: 1950–51

Individual
A.C. Milan Hall of Fame

References

External links
 Short biography of Andrea Bonomi
 Profile magliarossonera.it
 Profile at FIGC
 Profile at enciclopediadelcalcio.it

1923 births
2003 deaths
People from Cassano d'Adda
Italian footballers
Italy international footballers
Serie A players
Serie B players
A.C. Milan players
Brescia Calcio players
Piacenza Calcio 1919 players
Association football defenders
Footballers from Lombardy
Sportspeople from the Metropolitan City of Milan